= New South Wales Mine Subsidence Board =

The Mine Subsidence Board of New South Wales is a Government of New South Wales agency responsible for reducing the risk of mine subsidence damage to properties in New South Wales by assessing and controlling the types of buildings and improvements which can be erected in Mine Subsidence Districts. in coal mining areas of New South Wales.

The board is responsible for administering the Mine Subsidence Compensation Act. The Act provides for compensation or repair services where improvements are damaged by mine subsidence resulting from the extraction of coal.
